Emilio Bossi (December 31, 1870 – November 27, 1920) was a Swiss freethinker, journalist, lawyer and writer.

Bossi was born in Bruzella. He graduated in law at the University of Geneva. He wrote under the pseudonym Milesbo. He was an editor (1896–1902) and director (1915–1920) of the Gazzetta Ticinese newspaper and founded the L'Idea moderna newspaper in 1895. In he 1906 founded L'Azione, a radical-democratic group. He was one of the founders of the Unione Radicale Sociale Ticinese, a political group that requested separation of church and state.

He was deputy to the Grand Council (1905–10, 1914–20), the National Council (1914–20) and the Council of States (1920). He was the Ticino State Councillor and was Director of the Department of Interior (1910–1914).

Bossi was an advocate of the Christ myth theory. In 1904, he authored the book Gesù Cristo non è mai esistito (Jesus Christ Never Existed).

Publications

Sulla separazione dello Stato dalla Chiesa (1899) 
Gesù Cristo non è mai esistito (1900)
I clericali e la libertà (1909)
Venti mesi di storia svizzera (1916)

References

1870 births
1920 deaths
Christ myth theory proponents
Critics of Christianity
Freethought writers
People from Ticino
Swiss atheists
19th-century Swiss lawyers
19th-century Swiss journalists
University of Geneva alumni
20th-century Swiss journalists